Johannes Meier may refer to:
 Johannes Meier (footballer) (born 1984), German footballer
 Johannes Meier (politician) (1858–1945), Estonian politician